Elefante is the Italian, Spanish, Portuguese and Galician word for elephant: it may also refer to:

Geography
Elefante, a barangay of Banayoyo, Ilocos Sur, Philippines
Roca Elefante, the westernmost points of Mexico, on Guadalupe Island
Roccia dell Elefante, an archaeological  site in Sardinia

Music
"Elefantes", a popular Latin American children's song similar to the American Ten Monkeys Jumpin' On the Bed
"Elefantes", a song by Natalia Lafourcade from her 2002 album Natalia Lafourcade
"El elefante", a song by Caifanes from their 1990 album El diablito
El Elefante, an album by Leo Sidran
Elefantes (band), a Spanish band active from 1994 to 2006
Elefante (Mexican band), a Latin rock and pop band
Elefante (Uruguayan band), an Uruguayan rock band
 Elefante, the 2015 album by BulletBoys

People
John Elefante, an American rock and roll vocalist who got his start in the music business with the rock band Kansas
Elefante Bianco, a seaman on the Witte Olifant, a Dutch ship in the Battle of Leghorn
Michael Elefante, a member of the board of directors of Dow Jones & Company
Rufus Elefante  a corrupt political boss, trucker and activist in Utica, New York

Other uses
Cementerio de los Elefantes (Elephant Cemetery), the playing ground of Colón de Santa Fe, a  football team from Santa Fe, Argentina
L'elefante, the mascot of Pallacanestro Varese, an Italian basketball club founded in 1946
Elefante Tv, a defunct television channel in Italy